The National Council is the unicameral parliament (legislative body) of the Principality of Monaco. Formed in 1911 after the Monégasque Revolution, the National Council initially had 12 members, increased to 18 in 1962 and 24 members since 2002, who are elected from lists by universal suffrage. The National Council is chaired by a president, who was initially appointed by the sovereign prince but has been elected by the National Council members since  the year 1962. The current president of the National Council is Brigitte Boccone-Pagès.

History
The Monégasque Revolution of 1910 was a series of confrontations by the subjects of Monaco against their ruler, Prince Albert I. On 28 March 1910, Prince Albert I agreed to hold elections by universal suffrage for a parliament. This led to the end of absolute monarchy with the promulgation of the Constitution of Monaco on 7 January 1911. Elections were held for 12 members, with Prince Albert I retaining the right to appoint parliament's president. The inaugural meeting of the new parliament was on 3 May 1911.

The constitution was overhauled in 1962, which gave the National Council more power and increased its membership to 18 and to elect the president. Further changes were made to the constitution in 2002, further increasing the responsibility of the National Council and increasing its membership to 24.

Description
The body is composed of twenty-four members, who are elected from lists by universal suffrage. Of those, 16 seats are assigned from a majority list and 8 seats are filled proportionally from lists that obtain more than 5% of the votes. Councillors serve for five-year terms, and though it may act independently of the Prince when debating legislation or the State Budget, the Prince shares mutual power between himself and the National Council. He may dissolve it at any time, provided that new elections be held within three months. To be eligible to vote, people must be at least 25 years old and hold citizenship.

The Council meets at least twice per year to vote on the country's budget and bills proposed by the prince's government. Ordinances (executive orders) are debated in the Council of Government, and once approved, must be submitted to the Prince within eighty days for his signature, which makes them legally enforceable. If he does not express opposition within ten days of submission, they become valid. The current president of the National Council is Brigitte Boccone-Pagès.

Presidents

See also

 List of current members of the National Council of Monaco

References

External links

Official website
Bulletin of Conseil National

Government of Monaco
Monaco
Monaco
Monaco
Politics of Monaco
Political organisations based in Monaco